Moench may refer to:

 Conrad Moench, German botanist
 Doug Moench (born 1948), American comic book writer
 Emanuel Moench, economist who has worked with Tobias Adrian
 Louis F. Moench (1847–1916), founder of Weber Stake Academy
 Mönch, a Swiss mountain